(The Contents of the Desk) is a 2007 Japanese film directed by Keisuke Yoshida.

Reception
Mark Schilling of The Japan Times gave the film a positive review.

References

External links
 

Films directed by Keisuke Yoshida
2007 films
2000s Japanese-language films
2000s Japanese films